Spiced wine may refer to:

Conditum, a family of spiced wines in ancient Roman and Byzantine cuisine
Hippocras, a drink made from wine mixed with sugar and spices, usually including cinnamon, and possibly heated
Mulled wine, a beverage usually made with red wine along with various mulling spices and raisins, served hot or warm

Spices
Wine styles